The Boles Baronetcy, of Bishop's Lydeard in the County of Somerset, is a title in the Baronetage of the United Kingdom. It was created on 17 June 1922 for Dennis Boles, who represented Wellington and Taunton in the House of Commons as a Conservative. As of 2014 the title is held by his great-grandson, the fourth Baronet, who succeeded his father in that year.

Boles baronets, of Bishop's Lydeard (1922)
Sir Dennis Fortescue Boles, 1st Baronet (1861–1935)
Sir Gerald Fortescue Boles, 2nd Baronet (1900–1945)
Sir Jeremy John Fortescue Boles, 3rd Baronet (1932–2014)
Sir Richard Fortescue Boles, 4th Baronet (born 1958)

The heir apparent is the present holder's only son James Alexander Fortescue Boles (born 1993).

References

Boles